The 4T80E is a series of automatic transmissions from General Motors. Designed for transverse engine configurations, the series includes 4 forward gears. The 4Txx family is an evolution of the original Turbo-Hydramatic 125 transverse automatic introduced in the 1980 model year "X" body.

The 4T80-E transmission is electronically controlled and features an automatic overdrive transaxle with an electronically controlled torque converter clutch. The 4T80 originally used a viscous clutch, but this was changed in 2005.

The 4T80 is built at Willow Run Transmission in Ypsilanti, Michigan.

4T80-E
The "MH1" 4T80-E is able to handle vehicles up to 8000 lb (3628.74 kg) GVWR. The final drive ratio is 3.11:1, 3.48:1, or 3.71:1. The 4T80 uses a viscous torque converter clutch, which was replaced with  EC3 (electronically controlled converter clutch) in 2004.

The 4T80-E is a hydramatic transmission and was developed for use with V8 front-wheel-drive cars, specifically for the Cadillac Northstar engine. It was designed with extreme power handling capabilities at the time. The 4T80-E debuted in the Cadillac Allanté in 1993 along with the Northstar Double Overhead Camshaft (DOHC) V8. It reportedly cost 80% more than a similar GM 4T60 transmission and weighed 60 lb (27 kg) more.

This transaxle has been used in many of GM's front drive large sedans. The Cadillac Division had exclusive usage of the 4T80-E until the 1995 Oldsmobile Aurora debuted. The Aurora had the 4.0L version of the Northstar V8 coupled to a 4T80-E. It wasn't until 2004 that Pontiac got usage of this transaxle in the Bonneville GXP which employed a 275 horsepower version of the Northstar 4.6L V8.

The 4T80-E was last used in 2011 on the Cadillac DTS and the Buick Lucerne (when equipped with the 4.6L Northstar).

Gear ratios:

Applications:
 3.11:1
 1994–2005 Cadillac Deville
 1993-2002 Cadillac Eldorado
 1993-2004 Cadillac Seville
 2006 Cadillac DTS
3.48:1
 1995-1999 Oldsmobile Aurora
 3.71:1
 1996–2005 Cadillac Deville Concours/DTS
 1993-2002 Cadillac Eldorado ETC
 1993-2004 Cadillac Seville STS
 1995-1999 Oldsmobile Aurora
 2004–2005 Pontiac Bonneville GXP
 2006-2011 Buick Lucerne V8
 2001-2003 Oldsmobile Aurora V8

References

See also
 List of GM transmissions

4T80